42nd New York Film Critics Circle Awards
January 30, 1977
(announced January 3, 1977)

Best Picture: 
 All the President's Men 
The 42nd New York Film Critics Circle Awards, 30 January 1977, honored the best filmmaking of 1976.

Winners
Best Actor: 
Robert De Niro - Taxi Driver
Runners-up: David Carradine - Bound for Glory and Robert Duvall - Network and The Seven-Per-Cent Solution
Best Actress:
Liv Ullmann - Face to Face (Ansikte mot ansikte)
Runners-up: Faye Dunaway - Network and Sissy Spacek - Carrie
Best Director: 
Alan J. Pakula - All the President's Men
Runners-up: Martin Scorsese - Taxi Driver and Lina Wertmüller - Seven Beauties
Best Film:
All the President's Men
Runners-up: Network and Seven Beauties
Best Screenplay: 
Paddy Chayefsky - Network
Runners-up: Harold Pinter - The Last Tycoon and Lina Wertmüller - Seven Beauties
Best Supporting Actor: 
Jason Robards - All the President's Men
Runners-up: Harvey Keitel - Taxi Driver and Richard Pryor - Silver Streak
Best Supporting Actress: 
Talia Shire - Rocky
Runners-up: Jodie Foster - Taxi Driver and Marie-France Pisier - Cousin Cousine

References

External links
1976 Awards

1976
New York Film Critics Circle Awards, 1976
New York Film Critics Circle Awards
New York Film Critics Circle Awards
New York Film Critics Circle Awards
New York Film Critics Circle Awards